The 2006 season of the Fubon Enterprise Football League (formerly Chinese Taipei National Football League). Tatung F.C., as the winner of the season, will compete in the 2007 season of the AFC President's Cup, a club competition between football clubs of emerging nations in the Asian Football Confederation (AFC).

League table

Results

Round 1

Round 2

Round 3

Round 4

Round 5

Round 6

Round 7

Round 8

Round 9

Top goalscorers 

Top level Taiwanese football league seasons
Enterprise Football League seasons
Chinese Taipei
Chinese Taipei
1